The Sunward SA 60L Aurora is a Chinese light-sport aircraft, designed and produced by Sunward Aircraft, a division of Hunan Science and Technologies Co Ltd, an industrial machine manufacturer located in the Lu Gu High Technology Development Zone. The aircraft is intended to be supplied as a complete ready-to-fly-aircraft.

Design and development 
The Aurora was designed to comply with the US light-sport aircraft rules. It features a cantilever low-wing, a two-seats-in-side-by-side configuration enclosed cockpit under a bubble canopy, fixed tricycle landing gear and a single engine in tractor configuration. The aircraft's  span wing has a rectangular planform and employs flaps. The standard engine available is the Austrian-made  Rotax 912ULS four-stroke powerplant.

The Civil Aviation Administration of China granted the design a type design approval in mid-2013.

Bayerl et al. note that the Aurora closely resembles the Fly Synthesis Texan, but that the manufacturer claims the Aurora is an original design.

The aircraft can be equipped for banner-towing, aerial photography and has an airshow smoke generation system available.

In July 2014 the company announced an improved version, the SA 60V, with an upgraded engines installation using Austrian, rather than Chinese components and an IFR capable instrument panel.

The design was added to the Federal Aviation Administration's list of approved special light-sport aircraft on 20 August 2019.

Operational history
Reviewer Marino Boric described the design in a 2015 review as "stylish" and "elegant".

Variants
SA 60L
Original model
SA 60V
Upgraded model with engine installation improvements and IFR instrumentation

Specifications (SA 60L Aurora)

References

External links

Aurora
Light-sport aircraft
Single-engined tractor aircraft